Kottayan Katankot Venugopal (born 6 September 1931) is an Indian constitutional lawyer and a senior advocate in the Supreme Court of India. On 1 July 2017, he was appointed as the Attorney General of India and retired on 30 September, 2022. He is Patron of SAARCLAW (A regional apex body of SAARC) and earlier has been its President. He is founder of M K Nambyar SAARCLAW Centre For Advanced Legal Studies at the NALSAR Law University.

Early and personal life
Venugopal was born in a Nair family to M. K. Nambiar and Kalyani Nambiar in Kanhangad, a town in the South Canara district of Madras Presidency of British India (present-day Kerala, India), and grew up in Mangalore.

Venugopal did his B.Sc in Physics from the prestigious Madras Christian College, Chennai and law from Raja Lakhamgouda Law College, Belgaum. He had also studied at the St. Aloysius College, Mangaluru.

Career

Venugopal served as President of the Union Internationale des Avocats (UIA - International Association of Lawyers) from 1996 to 1997. 

Venugopal has appeared in many high-profile cases. Most significantly, he was appointed by the Royal Government of Bhutan to serve as the Constitutional adviser for drafting of the Constitution of Bhutan. On 30 June 2017, he was appointed as the Attorney General of India under the leadership of Prime Minister Narendra Modi. The 88-year-old succeeded Mukul Rohatgi, who stepped down after the first term. Venugopal held the office of Additional Solicitor General in Morarji Desai’s Government. He has appeared in a variety of cases in the last 50 years. Venugopal was appointed as amicuscuriae to assist the Supreme Court in the high profile 2G spectrum case.

He also appeared for the BJP leader L. K. Advani in the Demolition of the Babri Masjid case.

Honours
In 2015, he was conferred Padma Vibhushan award by the Government of India. This is the second-highest civilian honour in India. In 2002, he was awarded Padma Bhushan, the third-highest civilian honour.

Opinion on judicial reforms

Venugopal is one of the main advocates for judicial reforms in India. He is against the creation of regional benches of the Supreme Court of India. Instead, he recommends that Courts of Appeal be established in the four regions of the country, who finally decide on appeals from the High Court judgments in all cases other than cases of national importance which affect the whole country, disputes between States or between States and the Centre, Presidential references and substantial questions of law relating to interpretation of the Constitution. This will relieve the burden on Supreme Court.

References

1931 births
Living people
Recipients of the Padma Bhushan in public affairs
Recipients of the Padma Vibhushan in public affairs
Attorneys General of India
Supreme Court of India lawyers
Scholars from Mangalore
Indian barristers
Union Internationale des Avocats
20th-century Indian lawyers
21st-century Indian lawyers
University of Madras alumni
People from Kasaragod district